Peter Monroe Hagan (October 15, 1871 – October 24, 1930) was an American law enforcement officer who served as Sheriff of Putnam County, Florida in 1916–1924 and 1928–1930. He is known for opposing the Ku Klux Klan and mob violence in the county in the violent period between 1915 and 1930. His thwarting of lynching attempts and his winning the pivotal 1928 election became a referendum against Klan and mob violence.

Early life 
Peter Hagan was born on October 15, 1871 in Bradford County, Florida to J.C. Hagan and Annie Jane Swindle. He was the 14th of 16 children. He had a minimal education in his youth. On March 24, 1895 he married Sallie Mary Cannon.

Career

Early career
When he was fourteen, Hagan left his parents' home and found work at a grocery store in Palatka. After about a year he was hired as a night policeman for the city. After four years of this work he was elected police chief of Palatka, serving in the office for 11 years and seven months. Sheriff of Putnam County R.L. Kennerly subsequently appointed Hagan his chief deputy.

After five years of service with the sheriff's office Hagan was appointed deputy U.S. Marshal in the Southern District of Florida. Following one year in this position he was made deputy internal revenue collector, where he worked for two years.

Sheriff 
Hagan initially considered seeking the appointment to the office of U.S. Marshal for the Southern District, but decided to forgo this to run for the office of Sheriff of Putnam County in 1916. He won the contest with a large majority, defeating four other candidates. In the aftermath of World War I mob violence directed by the Ku Klux Klan and other white vigilantes against blacks, Catholics and women they accused of transgressing the social order was on the increase. This combined with Prohibition led to the highest crime rates in Putnam County's history. Hagan was faced with two lynching attempts in 1919 alone, after which he wrote in the Palatka Daily News:

He was re-elected with a large plurality over three opponents in June 1920, but racist mob violence only continued to increase.

Attempted lynching of Arthur Johnson 
In March 1923, a band of white road crew workers from Gainesville attempted to storm the Putnam County Jail with the intention of lynching Arthur Johnson, a black man awaiting trial on accusations of murdering their white co-worker Hugh C. Cross. The sheriff's official residence was on the site of the county jail. When Hagan opened the door he found the mob standing before him with guns and rope. He struck one man on the head with his pistol before shutting the door. The mob was surprised by the action and opened fire on the building, striking Hagan in the hand, but eventually departed. Hagan notified Sheriff Ramsey in Alachua County of the incident, leading to the arrest of eighteen men on their way back to Gainesville. Hagan was praised by state legislators and the press for his actions in stopping the attack, but of the eighteen culprits arrested only nine made it to trial and they were swiftly acquitted by the white jury.

Defeat and re-election 
In 1924 Hagan was challenged for his office in the Democratic primary by two men with ties to the Klan. Announcing his campaign for re-election on March 7, 1924, Hagan stated his position on the Ku Klux Klan:

Hagan was ultimately defeated and replaced by R. J. Hancock. The KKK would reach the peak of its local influence two years later, but by 1928 public opinion was shifting and Sheriff Hagan was voted back into office after a four-year absence. He suffered a cerebral hemorrhage and died on October 24, 1930 at his home in Palatka.

Further reading

References

Works cited 
 

1871 births
1930 deaths
People from Putnam County, Florida
Florida sheriffs
United States Marshals